The Unknown Man is a 1951 American courtroom drama film directed by Richard Thorpe and starring Walter Pidgeon, Ann Harding and Barry Sullivan.

Plot
Defense attorney Dwight Bradley Masen (Walter Pidgeon) is successful in seeking the acquittal of a young man, Rudi Walchek (Keefe Brasselle), accused of knifing to death the 19-year-old son of a local locksmith, but when Rudi lets a comment slip after the trial, Masen realizes he has defended a guilty man. Masen discovers that Rudi is also a member of a syndicate extorting money from the scared merchants in the locksmith's neighborhood. After unearthing new evidence, Masen tries to convince the D.A. (Barry Sullivan) to retry the case, but the latter refuses on grounds of double jeopardy.

Masen discovers that the head of the citizens' crime commission is also involved in the syndicate. In a rage Masen kills Layford (Eduard Franz), but the murder is pinned on Rudi. Despite sensing a higher justice at work, Masen feels obliged to defend Rudi once again. This time Rudi is found guilty. Masen confesses to the D.A. that he is the culprit, but the D.A. feels justice has been served and refuses to reopen the case. Masen makes one final visit to Rudi in prison, confesses, gives him the murder weapon and turns his back to Rudi to await his fate.

Cast
 Walter Pidgeon as Dwight Bradley "Brad" Masen
 Ann Harding as Stella Masen
 Barry Sullivan as DA Joe Bucknor
 Keefe Brasselle as Rudi Walchek
 Lewis Stone as Judge James V. Holbrook 
 Eduard Franz as Andrew Jason "Andy" Layford
 Richard Anderson as Bob Masen
 Dawn Addams as Ellie Fansworth
 Philip Ober as Wayne Kellwin
 Konstantin Shayne as Peter Hulderman
 Mari Blanchard as Sally Tever
 Don Beddoe as Ed—Fingerprint Man
 John Maxwell as Dr. Palmer
 Robert Williams as Sam—Deputy

Reception
According to MGM records the film earned $381,000 in the US and Canada and $330,000 elsewhere, resulting in a loss of $455,000.

Critical response
Film critic Dennis Schwartz questioned the screenplay and the casting in his review of the film, "A contrived morality lesson is delivered by sentimental lawyer Walter Pidgeon, from a plot that is held together by social conscious issues alone. Richard Thorpe directs this capable but miscast cast (romantic lead Pidgeon is a fish out of water playing a lawyer, supporting actors Lewis Stone and Ann Harding seem stiff taking roles away from their usual comedy ones) in this bizarre and incredulous triumph of justice tale ... By the end, everyone looked foolish with Pidgeon looking dead foolish. Pidgeon has the kind of ridiculous lawyer part where even someone as esteemed as Clarence Darrow couldn't have played it convincingly; so I don't blame Pidgeon for this misfire."

Critic Craig Butler also discussed the screenplay in his review, "The Unknown Man has an interesting message, but the manner in which it is presented makes for some significant believability problems. For instance, it's hard to believe that a lawyer with no criminal trial experience would be able to get his client off in the way he does in Man ... Man might have been a better film if the writers had kept things a little simpler, but it's worth a look for crime fans on the lookout for something they haven't seen a dozen times."

Comic book adaption
 Avon Periodicals: The Unknown Man (1951)

References

External links
 
 
 
 

1951 films
American black-and-white films
Film noir
Films directed by Richard Thorpe
Metro-Goldwyn-Mayer films
American courtroom films
Films adapted into comics
American neo-noir films
American drama films
1951 drama films
1950s English-language films
1950s American films